Izumi is a Japanese restaurant located in Dhaka, Bangladesh. It is a sister concern of Holey Artisan Bakery.

History
Masayuki Nakajimaya is the executive chief of Izumi. The restaurant flies in Tuna from Tsukiji Market in Tokyo, Japan. In 2015, it was placed as the third best Japanese restaurant in Dhaka by The Daily Star foodies choice award.

See also 

 List of Japanese restaurants

References

Japanese restaurants
Restaurants in Dhaka